Cingulina is a genus  of small sea snails, pyramidellid gastropod mollusks. in the family Pyramidellidae, the pyrams and their allies.

Description
The shell is turriculated and subulate. The numerous whorls are rounded and spirally ribbed. The interstices are striate. The aperture is oblong, entire in front. The columella is straight and simple. The outer lip is sharp and arcuate. The shell lacks basal keels, varices are absent. The spiral sculpture is stronger than microscopic striations. The axial sculpture consists of faint riblets, with the spiral markings consisting of strong raised threads.

Distribution
This species is mainly distributed off the coasts of Japan and various European countries.

Species
 Cingulina acutilirata G. B. Sowerby III, 1892
 Cingulina aikeni Poppe, Tagaro & Goto, 2018
 Cingulina archimedea Melvill, 1896
 Cingulina austrina Laseron, 1959
 Cingulina bellardii Hornung & Mermod, 1924
 Cingulina brazieri Angas, G.F., 1877 
 Cingulina cingulata (Dunker, 1860)
 Cingulina circinata A. Adams, 1860
 Cingulina dussaulti Saurin, 1962
 Cingulina imperita Laseron, 1959
 Cingulina inaequalis Saurin, 1958
 Cingulina inamuragasakiensis Nomura, 1938
 Cingulina isseli (Tryon, 1886)
 Cingulina japonica Clessin, 1902
 Cingulina laticingula (Dall, W.H. & P. Bartsch, 1906) 
 Cingulina magna Gatliff & Gabriel, 1910
 Cingulina pulchra (Brazier, 1894)
 Cingulina puncticingulata Nomura, 1938
 Cingulina rhyllensis Gatliff & Gabriel, 1910
 Cingulina rugosa Saurin, 1959
 Cingulina secernenda Melvill, 1918
 Cingulina spina (Crosse & Fischer, 1864)
 Cingulina superba Thiele, 1925
 † Cingulina tardichattica Lozouet, 1999 
 Cingulina trisulcata Sowerby III, 1894
 Cingulina truncata Saurin, 1959
Species brought into synonymy
 Cingulina aglaia (Bartsch, 1915): synonym of Polyspirella aglaia (Bartsch, 1915)
 Cingulina australis Tenison-Woods, 1877: synonym of Lironoba australis (Tenison-Woods, 1877)
 Cingulina babylonia (C. B. Adams, 1845): synonym of Pseudoscilla babylonia (C. B. Adams, 1845)
 Cingulina biarata Nomura, 1937: synonym of Paracingulina triarata (Pilsbry, 1904)
 Cingulina callista (Bartsch, 1915): synonym of Polyspirella callista (Bartsch, 1915)
 Cingulina carinata Mörch, 1876: synonym of Teretinax carinata (Mörch, 1876)
 Cingulina densistriata Nomura, 1936: synonym of Murchisonella densistriata (Nomura, 1936) (original combination)
 Cingulina evermanni (Baker, Hanna & Strong, 1928): synonym of Murchisonella evermanni (F. Baker, Hanna & A. M. Strong, 1928)
 Cingulina inequicingulata (Nomura, 1938): synonym of Paracingulina inequicingulata (Nomura, 1938)
 Cingulina insignis May, 1911: synonym of Seila insignis (May, 1911)
 Cingulina laticingulata [sic]: synonym of Cingulina laticingula (Dall & Bartsch, 1906) (misspelling)
 Cingulina mutuwanensis Nomura, 1938: synonym of Cingulina cingulata (Dunker, 1860)
 Cingulina terebra (Dunker, 1860): synonym of Paracingulina terebra (Dunker, 1860)
 Cingulina torcularis (Tenison-Woods, 1878): synonym of Icuncula torcularis (Tenison-Woods, 1878)
 Cingulina trachealis (Gould, 1861): synonym of Polyspirella trachealis (Gould, 1861)
 Cingulina triarata Pilsbry, 1904: synonym of Paracingulina triarata (Pilsbry, 1904)
 Cingulina urdeneta (Bartsch, 1917): synonym of Turbonilla urdeneta Bartsch, 1917

References

 Vaught, K.C. (1989). A classification of the living Mollusca. American Malacologists: Melbourne, FL (USA). . XII, 195 pp
 Gofas, S.; Le Renard, J.; Bouchet, P. (2001). Mollusca, in: Costello, M.J. et al. (Ed.) (2001). European register of marine species: a check-list of the marine species in Europe and a bibliography of guides to their identification. Collection Patrimoines Naturels, 50: pp. 180–213

Pyramidellidae
Gastropod genera